Hyperdynamic circulation is abnormally increased circulatory volume. Systemic vasodilation and the associated decrease in peripheral vascular resistance results in decreased pulmonary capillary wedge pressure and decreased blood pressure, presenting usually with a collapsing pulse, but sometimes a bounding pulse. In effort to compensate the heart will increase cardiac output and heart rate, which accounts for the increased pulse pressure and sinus tachycardia.  The condition sometimes accompanies septic shock, preeclampsia, and other physiological and psychiatric conditions.


Possible causes 

 Kidney disease
 Hypervolemia
 Adrenal crisis - especially after fluid replacement
 Anemia
 Anxiety
 Aortic Regurgitation
 AV fistulae
 Beriberi
 Dysautonomia
 Erythroderma
 Exercise
 Liver failure
 Hydrocephalus
 Hypercapnia
 Paget's disease
 Portal hypertension
 Pregnancy
 Pyrexia
 Thyrotoxicosis
 Vasodilator drugs

References

Cardiovascular diseases